Occupant is a play by Edward Albee, published in 2001.

Productions
The play was originally set to premiere in 2002 at Signature Theatre Company in New York City in a production starring Anne Bancroft. Bancroft fell ill with pneumonia, causing the production to be cancelled. The play premiered at the Peter Norton Space of Signature Theatre Company in 2008 in a production starring Mercedes Ruehl and directed by Pam MacKinnon.

Synopsis
The entire play consists of a hypothetical interview of 20th century sculptor Louise Nevelson that takes place years after her death in 1988. The interviewer is an unnamed man that may possibly be a stand-in for the playwright or Maria Nevelson, Founder of the Louise Nevelson Foundation. The first half of the play deals with Nevelson's childhood in a family of Russian Jewish immigrants in Rockland, Maine as well as her failed marriage to Charles Nevelson. The second half chronicles her life as an artist, rise to fame, and her eventual death. Throughout the play, the interviewer takes on an active role, often questioning Nevelson's version of reality and prying into details of her personal life. The play ends with Nevelson "occupying" her place as a preeminent American sculptor.

Themes
The play repeatedly deals with themes of reality versus illusion, and the reliability of memory. The play also explores feminist and Jewish identity, highlighting the challenges Nevelson faced as a Jewish woman in the art world.

Critical reception
Ben Brantley writing in The New York Times described the play as having "a conversational flow that quickly carries you past fears of being trapped in a lecture hall." The review also praised Ruehl's performance as having a "seductive humility."

References

Plays by Edward Albee
2001 plays